Alberto Oliverio (born December 1, 1938) is a biologist and psycho-biologist. He is currently professor of Psychobiology at the Sapienza University of Rome. He has been one of the main assistants of Nobel prize winner Daniel Bovet.

Publications
Oliverio is author or co-author of about 400 publications. He is author of about 30 chapters or general reviews in edited books or annual reviews. Has edited 6 books on animal behavior and behavioral genetics and is the author of many books on memory, brain and behavior.

Research fields
Neurochemical – neurophysiological correlates of memory. Genetic approaches to behavior.

Books
Oliverio A. & Oliverio Ferraris A., Lo sviluppo comparato del comportamento, Boringhieri, Turin, 1974.
Oliverio A. & Oliverio Ferraris A., Psicologia: Basi biologiche, sviluppo, ambiente, Zanichelli, Bologna, 1976; 2nd Edition, 1980; 3rd Edition (Psicologia: I motivi del comportamento umano), 1986; 4th Edition, 1990; 5th edition 1996; 6th edition 2002; 7th edition 2007.
Oliverio A., (Ed.) Zoologia 1: Comunicazione e comportamento sociale. Letture da Le Scienze, Le Scienze, Milan, 1977.
Oliverio A., Maturità e vecchiaia, Feltrinelli, Milan, 1977.
Oliverio A.. (Ed.) Genetics, Environment and Intelligence, North Holland, Amsterdam, 1977.
Oliverio A. & Oliverio Ferraris A., Maschio/Femmina: Biologia, psicologia, sociologia nel comportamento sessuale, Zanichelli, Bologna, 1978.
Oliverio A., La società solitaria, Editori Riuniti, Rome, 1979.
Oliverio A. Come nasce un conformista, Editori Riuniti, Rome, 1980. Portuguese Transl: Como nasce um conformista,  Moraes / Sódilivros,  1986
Oliverio A. & Castellano C., I farmaci del cervello: Droghe e psicofarmaci. Classeunica n. 206, ERI, Rome, 1980.
Oliverio A., (Ed.) Cervello e comportamento, Newton Compton, Rome, 1981.
Oliverio A., Biologia e comportamento, Zanichelli, Bologna, 1982 (2nd. Edition, 1987).
Oliverio A., (Ed.) "Orologi biologici, Quaderni de Le Scienze" n.9, Le Scienze, Milan, 1982.
Oliverio A., Saper invecchiare, Libri di Base, Editori Riuniti, Rome, 1982.
Oliverio A., I meccanismi dell'apprendimento, Frontiere della Scienza, Fabbri Editori, Milan 1983.
Ferraris A. & Oliverio A., I ritmi della vita, Libri di base, Editori Riuniti, Rome, 1983.
Oliverio A. & Oliverio A., L'alba del comportamento umano, Laterza, Rome, 1983.
Oliverio A. & Michele Zappella, (Ed.) The behavior of human Infants, Plenum Press, New York, 1983.
Oliverio A., Le scienze: letture di chimica e biologia, Laterza, Rome, 1984.
Oliverio A., La materia e i numeri, Laterza, Rome, 1984.
Oliverio A., Lo spazio e il tempo, Laterza, Rome, 1984.
Oliverio A., Storia naturale della mente: l'evoluzione del comportamento, Boringhieri, Turin, 1984.
Oliverio A. & Oliverio A., La scienza e l'immaginario, Editori Riuniti, Rome, 1986.
Oliverio A., Alfabeto della mente, Edizioni Dedalo, Bari, 1986.
Oliverio A., L'evoluzione del cervello, Scienza e Dossier (Suppl.) n.8, November 1986.
Oliverio A., Dalle molecole al cervello, Scienza e Dossier (Suppl.) n. 15, Giugno 1987.
Oliverio A. & Oliverio A., "Nei labirinti della mente, Laterza, Rome, 1989. Spanish transl: En los laberintos de la mente, Grijalbo, Argentina Ponente, México, 1992". Economica Laterza, Rome, 1998.
Oliverio A., Per puro caso, Leonardo, Milano, 1989 (Edizione Euroclub, Milano, 1990).
Oliverio A., Il tempo ritrovato: la memoria e le neuroscienze, Theoria, Rome, 1990.
Puglisi-Allegra S. & Oliverio A., (Eds.) "Psychobiology of Stress", NATO ASI Series, Behavioural and Social Sciences Vol. 54, Kluwer Academic Publishers, Dordrecht, 1990.
Oliverio A., Neandertal, Leonardo, Milan, 1993.
Ferraris A. e Oliverio A. La persona, la sessualità, l'amore. Loescher, Turin1994.
Oliverio A. Ricordi individuali, memorie collettive, Einaudi, Turin, 1994.
Oliverio A. Biologia e filosofia della mente, Laterza, Rome, 1995.
Oliverio A. L'arte di pensare, Rizzoli, Milan, 1997. BUR Saggi, Milan 1999. Japanese transl: 論理的思考の技術  Daiwa Shobo, Tokio, 2003.
Oliverio A. L'arte di ricordare, Rizzoli, Milan, 1998. 6 editions. BUR Saggi, Milan 2000. Edizioni Mondolibri, 1999. BUR Saggi, Milan, 2000. Spanish transl: La memoria. El arte de recordar. Alianza Editorial, Madrid, 2000. Portuguese transl: A memória e os seus segredos. Editorial Presença, Lisbona, 2001. Japanese transl: 覚える技術  Shoeisha, Tokio, 2002.
Oliverio A. L'arte di imparare. Rizzoli, Milan, 1999 BUR Saggi, Milano 2001. Japanese transl: SogenSha, Tokyo 2006. 東京創元社 メタ認知的アプローチによる学ぶ技術
Oliverio A. Esplorare la mente. Il cervello tra filosofia e biologia. Raffaello Cortina, Milan, 1999.
Oliverio A. La mente. Istruzioni per l'uso. Rizzoli, Milan, 2001. BUR Saggi, Milan 2004.
Oliverio A. Prima lezione di Neuroscienze. Laterza, Rome, 2002.
Oliverio A. Dove ci porta la scienza. Laterza, Rome, 2003.
Oliverio A. Memoria e oblio. Rubbettino, Soveria mannelli, 2003.
Oliverio A. e Oliverio Ferraris A. Le età della mente, Rizzoli, Milan, 2004. BUR Saggi, Milan 2005.
Oliverio A. Istruzioni per restare intelligenti. Rizzoli, Milan, 2005. BUR Saggi, Milan 2006. MondoLibri, Milan, 2006. Albanian transl: Botimet Max, Tirana 2006  Si ta ruajmë inteligjencën.
 Oliverio A. "Come nasce un’idea. Intelligenza, creatività, genio nell’era della distrazione". Rizzoli, Milano, 2006. Mondolibri, Milano, 2007. Korean Transl: "MINUMSA" 2008 Greek Transl: "Lector", 2009. Japanese transl: "SogenSha", Tokio  
Oliverio A. "Geografia della mente. Territori cerebrali e comportamenti umani". Raffaello Cortina, Milano, 2008.
Oliverio A. "La vita nascosta del cervello". Giunti, Firenze, 2009.
Oliverio A. "Cervello" Bollati Boringhieri 2012. Spanish transl: "Cerebro", "Adriana Hidalgo Editora", 2013.
Oliverio A. "Immaginazione e memoria" Mondadori Università 2013.
Oliverio Ferraris A. e Oliverio A. "Più forti delle avversità". "Bollati Boringhieri", 2014.
Oliverio A. "Il cervello che impara", "Giunti", Firenze 2017

References

External links
 Homepage

Italian biologists
Science teachers
1938 births
Living people
Academic staff of the D'Annunzio University of Chieti–Pescara